The IBU Summer Biathlon  is a sporting event organized by the International Biathlon Union (IBU) which combines trail running or  roller skiing and rifle shooting, or sometimes trail running and rifle shooting. It is modeled after the IBU (winter) biathlon, which is an Olympic sport that combines rifle shooting with cross-country skiing. The Summer Biathlon World Championships have been held annually since 1990. Trail running was part of the world championships until 2009.

See also 
 IBU Biathlon
 ISSF Target Sprint
 Biathlon orienteering
 Nordic shooting with cross-country running, a Nordic biathlon variant using fullbore rifles
 Moose biathlon, another Nordic biathlon variant using fullbore rifles

References

External links